, 1935-15 October 2016 was a versatile Japanese photographer, active since the 1960s.

Life and work

Born in Kanda (Tokyo) on 25 February 1935, Tomiyama dropped out of evening high school in 1956  to study photography for himself. 

From 1960 he was employed as a photographer for the new magazine Josei Jishin; from 1963 he was employed by Asahi Shinbunsha (publisher of Asahi Shinbun), and in the following year he started "Gendai gokan" for the company's news weekly Asahi Journal. The series — the literal meaning of whose title is something like "a sense for the contemporary language" — won Tomiyama the 1966 newcomer's prize of Nihon Shashin Hihyōka Kyōkai. In 1966 Tomiyama became a freelance, making extensive travels abroad.

Tomiyama's book Sadogashima, a collection of photographs of Sado island published in 1978/79, won the Kodansha Publishing Culture Award for a work of photography and the PSJ annual award.

In 1994 Tomiyama was shown the archive of glass plates by the then-forgotten Sado-based amateur photographer Tomio Kondō. He printed many of these and acted as editor in chief for the first major collection of Kondō's works. This won him the PSJ annual award for a second time.

Tomiyama's works are in the permanent collection of the Tokyo Metropolitan Museum of Photography and the National Museum of Modern Art, Tokyo.

Exhibitions
"Japan Today". ICP (Manhattan), 1978.
Digital photography exhibition for the 50th anniversary of the People's Republic of China. Beijing Art Museum, 1999.
"Zen shūgyō". Wako (Ginza, Tokyo), 2002.
"Tomiyama Haruo no Sadogashima". Canon Salon (Tokyo), 2003.
"Gendai gokan: our day". JCII Photo Salon (Ichibanchō, Chiyoda-ku, Tokyo), 2008. 
"Maboroshi no chōtokkyū Ajia-go". Gallery Walk, Shiodome Media Tower (Shinbashi, Tokyo), 2009.

Books

Books of Tomiyama's work
Tōkyō no 12-shō. Kyoto: Tankōshinsha, 1963.  With Yasaburō Ikeda and Kiyoshi Fujikawa. The title means "Twelve chapters of Tokyo".
Gendai gokan. Eizō no Gendai 6. Tokyo: Chūōkōronsha, 1971. 
Sadogashima. Tokyo: Asahi Shinbunsha, 1979.  A large book of black and white photographs of Sado island. Captions and text in Japanese.
Chūgoku. 3 vols.　Tokyo: Nihon Kōtsū Kōsha, 1982. 
Jūnidaime Ichikawa Danjūrō: Shūmei zenkiroku. Tokyo: Heibonsha, 1985. .  Photographs of Ichikawa Danjūrō XII.
Hokuō ni mau hannya. Tokyo: the photographer, 1986.  The title means "Paññā dancing in northern Europe".
Gendai gokan: 1961–1999. Beijing, 1999.
 Zen shūgyō. Tokyo: Sōtōshū Shūmuchō, 2002.  On zen training, published by the Sōtō school.
 Gekkō no kizuna: Wakaki Ikeda Daisaku, 1972-nen no kioku. Tokyo: Usio, 2002. .  Photos taken in 1972 of the Buddhist magnate Daisaku Ikeda, from the Sōka Gakkai publisher. The title means "The bonds of moonlight: Young Daisaku Ikeda, memories of 1972."
Gendai gokan: 1960–2004 our day. Tokyo: Kōdansha, 2004. . 
Gendai gokan: 1960–2008 our day. JCII Photo Salon Library 207. Tokyo: JCII, 2008.

Other books with contributions by Tomiyama
Ningen kakumei no kiroku / The Document of Human Revolution. Tokyo: Shashin-hyōronsha, 1973.  With Yasuhiro Ishimoto. About Sōka Gakkai.
Nihon no banka: Ushinaware yuku kurashi no katachi. Tokyo: Kadokawa-shoten, 1979.  With Tetsurō Morimoto.
Kyōgeki. 2 vols. Tokyo: Heibonsha, 1980.  With others.
Shigosen no matsuri: Yamamoto Yasue no kai kōen. Tokyo: Iwanami Hall, 1980.  With Junji Kinoshita. Title means "Festival of the meridian: Lectures of the Yasue Yamamoto society".
Tōkyō: Toshi no shisen / Tokyo: A City Perspective. Tokyo: Tokyo Metropolitan Museum of Photography, 1990.  Exhibition catalogue.  
Nihon shashin no tenkan: 1960 nendai no hyōgen / Innovation in Japanese Photography in the 1960s. Tokyo: Tokyo Metropolitan Museum of Photography, 1991.  Exhibition catalogue. 
Sado mangekyō. Matsumoto: Kyōdo Shuppansha, 1994. .  Tomiyama is the editor. A generous anthology of photography of Sado island by Tomio Kondō, showing family life, farming, tourism, new technology, popular spectacles, and much else. The title means "Sado kaleidoscope".

References

External links
Tomiyama's site 
Tomiyama's blog 

Japanese photographers
1935 births
2016 deaths
People from Tokyo
Street photographers